Alectoria Island is a low, nearly ice-free island less than  long. It was surveyed in 1945 by the Falkland Islands Dependencies Survey, who named it after the lichen Alectoria which was predominant on the island at the time.

See also 
 List of Antarctic and sub-Antarctic islands

Map
 Trinity Peninsula. Scale 1:250000 topographic map No. 5697. Institut für Angewandte Geodäsie and British Antarctic Survey, 1996.

References 

 SCAR Composite Antarctic Gazetteer.

Islands of Trinity Peninsula